Short Eyes may refer to:

 Short Eyes (play), by Miguel Piñero
 Short Eyes (film), adaptation directed by Robert M. Young
 Short Eyes (album), by Curtis Mayfield